The Light Armoured Car (Aust), also known as Rover, was an armoured car produced in Australia during the Second World War.

History and description
At the outbreak of the Second World War, the United Kingdom was unable to meet the needs of the Commonwealth for armoured fighting vehicles. This led many Commonwealth countries to develop their own AFVs.

The Rover was designed in 1941. It used Ford 3-ton Canadian Military Pattern truck chassis, either F60L or the shorter F60S. The armoured bodies were produced by Ruskin Motor Bodies of Melbourne. The production was stopped in 1943, a total of 238 cars were built.

The Rover entered service with the Australian Army in April 1942. It never saw combat and was used mostly for crew training. A long narrow opening at the top of the hull earned the vehicle a nickname: "mobile slit trench". Late in 1943 Australia started to receive US-made armoured cars and the Rover was soon declared obsolete.

There are three restored Rover Mk II cars on display in Australian museums: at the National Military Vehicle Museum in Edinburgh Parks in South Australia; at the Royal Australian Armoured Corps Tank Museum in Puckapunyal, Victoria; and at the Australian Armour and Artillery Museum in Cairns, Queensland.

Variants
Mk I – F60L chassis (40 units).
Mk II – F60S chassis (198 units).

References

 Cecil, Michael K. (1993). Australian Scout and Armoured Cars 1933 to 1945, Australian Military Equipment Profiles, Vol. 3, .

External links

Diggerhistory.info
Old CMP
Australian CMP Based Armoured Vehicles
Rover Mark 1 Light Armored Car at warwheels.net
Rover Mark 2 Light Armored Car at warwheels.net

World War II armoured cars
World War II armoured fighting vehicles of Australia
Military vehicles introduced from 1940 to 1944